David Hodges (born 1978) is an American musician.

David Hodges may also refer to:
David A. Hodges (born 1937), American electrical engineer
David Hodges (CSI), a character from the television series CSI: Crime Scene Investigation
Dave Hodges (rugby union) (born 1968), American rugby union coach
David Hodges (footballer) (born 1970), English footballer

See also
David Hodge (disambiguation)
David U. Hoges, American actor who appears in The Fugitive